Fujiwara no Koretada/Koremasa (藤原 伊尹; 924 – December 9, 972), also known as Ichijō Sesshō, was a Japanese statesman, courtier,  politician and waka-poet during the Heian period. His poems were published in "The Collected Poems of the First Ward Regent", Ichijo Sessho Gyoshu, and in Hyakunin Isshu (poem No. 45). He was handsome and wise, and his personality was flashy.

Career
Emperor Murakami named Koretada conservator of Japanese poetry in 951.

Koretada served as a minister during the reign of Emperor En'yū.

 970 (Tenroku 1, 1st month): Koretada is named udaijin.
 970 (Tenroku 1, 5th month): After the death of Fujiwara no Saneyori, Koretada is named sesshō (regent).
 971 (Tenroku 2, 11th month): Koretada assumes the office of daijō daijin.
 972 (Tenroku 3, 5th day of the 1st month): The enthronement of Emperor En'yu is supervised by Koretada.
 972 (Tenroku 3, 11th month): Koretada died at age 49; and he was posthumously raised to first class rank.  He was granted the posthumous title of Mikawa-kō. His body was buried in Tenanji Temple.

The immediate consequence of Koretada's death was a period of intense rivalry between his brothers Kanemichi and Kaneie.

Genealogy
This member of the Fujiwara clan was the son of Morosuke.  He was the oldest son; and became head of the Hokke branch of the clan after his uncle Saneyori died in 970.

He was born between Fujiwara no Morosuke and Fujiwara no Moriko.

Koretada had four brothers: Kaneie, Kanemichi, Kinsue, and Tamemitsu.

Notes

References
 Brinkley, Frank and Dairoku Kikuchi. (1915). A History of the Japanese People from the Earliest Times to the End of the Meiji Era. New York: Encyclopædia Britannica. OCLC 413099
 Nussbaum, Louis-Frédéric and Käthe Roth. (2005).  Japan encyclopedia. Cambridge: Harvard University Press. ; OCLC 58053128
 Titsingh, Isaac. (1834). Nihon Odai Ichiran; ou,  Annales des empereurs du Japon.  Paris: Royal Asiatic Society, Oriental Translation Fund of Great Britain and Ireland. OCLC 5850691

924 births
972 deaths
Fujiwara clan
Regents of Japan
Japanese male poets
10th-century Japanese poets
Hyakunin Isshu poets